Robert Ellyson (1615/20– 1671) was a politician, military officer and physician who emigrated from Scotland to Saint Mary's County in the Province of Maryland and later moved to the Colony of Virginia, where he also held various offices, including thrice representing James City County in the House of Burgesses.

Early life 
Probably born between 1615 and 1620 in Lanarkshire, Scotland, neither this date range, precise location nor his parentage have been confirmed. However, he was educated.

Career 
Ellyson presumably arrived in the American colonies in the early 1640s, for his name appears in the tax levy for Saint Mary’s Hundred in Maryland of August 2, 1642, which assessed him to pay thirty pounds of tobacco as a tax. In September of that year, he appears in records of nearby Kent County, where he may also have owned land. Identified as a “barber-chirurgeon” in January 1643, Ellyson served patients on Kent Island. He sued several of his patients who had failed to pay for his medical services. Some of the payments sought were in quantities of tobacco (the main export good), ranging from the small (such as 250 pounds of tobacco from Henry Brooks or 190 pounds from John Dandy), to 1,156 pounds of tobacco from Sir Edmond Ployden.

Dr. Ellyson also became involved in local Maryland politics. He was elected sheriff of St. Mary’s County, and assumed office in January 1643, but his tenure lasted less than two months, until February 9, 1643. During that brief tenure, he was among those who investigated the case of treason of Richard Ingle, who later spearheaded a rebellion against Lord Baltimore, Maryland’s Catholic governor. Ellyson's final mention in Maryland records was in February 1644.

By 1646, Ellyson had moved to York County, Virginia, and was listed there as a lawyer. He helped settle several estates, claiming 1,030 pounds from the property of Robert Jackson. He resided in the colony's capitol, Jamestown, then surrounding James City and Gloucester Counties during the 1650s. James City County voters elected Ellyson as a burgess in his own right, and he served in the 1655/56 session, and later in the 1660 session, then the lengthy, multi-year session which began in 1661. Burgesses selected him as their sergeant-at-arms in the 1657-1658 session.

Ellyson also served as a local justice of the peace (the justices jointly administering the county in that era) in 1657, and the high sheriff. Along with sometime Speaker Walter Chiles, Ellyson served on the selected committee of the Council and Assembly in 1660 to draft plans for the third state house at Jamestown. In order to solve the boundary dispute that had arisen with Maryland, Ellyson accompanied Edmund Scarborough, Virginia's Surveyor General, to Manakin to consult with other commissioners.
Ellyson also actively participated in the local militias, and at various times was referred to as Colonel, Lieutenant Colonel, Captain, and Major, though not in correct sequential rank. Titles were not used without permission in that era, but documentation concerning his military background or career is lacking.

In 1657, Ellyson patented land in both in New Kent County and on the narrows of the York River. He increased his landholdings by acquiring 200 acres in James City County on Burchen Swamp. His additional property included land on Ware Creek, which he owned in the 1660s.

Ellyson may have died in September 1671, though his exact death date is unknown. The General Court ordered Capt. George Lyall to pay a debt of 593 pounds of tobacco from Ellyson's estate.

Marriage and children 
They were married in 1642, Ellyson married Elizabeth Gerard. Although some suggest that she was the daughter of Thomas Gerrard, a Catholic physician from Maryland, due to the first name of her eldest son, no documentation confirms that connection between the two families. Ellyson’s wife was present at the baptism of William Randolph, the son of Henry Randolph, in 1658.

They had 3 children, both of which survived into adulthood:

 Gerrard Robert Ellyson (Oct 7,1656 -Jan 2, 1749), married Anne Myhill.
 Hannah Ellyson (1644– 1728), married Captain Anthony Armistead on July 18, 1698.
Eleanor Ellyson (1665 -July 1722), married Thomas Bains . They had 4 children

References 

1610s births
1671 deaths
People from Lanarkshire
Kingdom of Scotland emigrants to the Thirteen Colonies
House of Burgesses members
People of colonial Maryland
Virginia colonial people
Year of birth uncertain